Tsuda may refer to:

Tsuda (surname), a Japanese surname
Tsuda, Kagawa, a former town in Ōkawa District, Kagawa Prefecture, Japan
Tsuda Station, a railway station in Hirakata, Osaka Prefecture, Japan
Tsuda University, a university in Kodaira, Tokyo, Japan
79254 Tsuda, a main-belt asteroid